The Cool Surface (released in the Philippines as The Playmate) is a 1994 thriller film written and directed by Erik Anjou and starring Robert Patrick, Teri Hatcher, Cyril O'Reilly, Matt McCoy, Shannon Dobson and Ian Buchanan.

Plot
A writer returns to Hollywood after finishing his novel in the wilderness. Still smarting from his girlfriend's suicide and his publisher's criticisms of his novel, he becomes intrigued by the neighbor couple's abusive relationship. Eventually he intervenes and becomes involved with the woman, basing a new book on their increasingly violent relationship sparked by his insane jealousy of her friends and her acting career.

Release
The Cool Surface was released direct to video in United States on April 5, 1994. In the Philippines, the film was released in theaters as The Playmate on April 26, 1995.

References

External links

1994 films
1990s erotic thriller films
American erotic thriller films
Films set in Los Angeles
Films shot in Los Angeles
1990s English-language films
1990s American films